Uch Daraq or Uchdaraq may refer to:
 Uch Daraq, East Azerbaijan
 Uch Daraq, alternate name of Owch Darreh-ye Moghanli Ogham Ali